Talegaon Dhamdhere  is a panchayat village in the state of Maharashtra, India, on the right (south) bank of the Vel River (Wel River).  Administratively, Talegaon Dhamdhere is under Shirur Taluka of Pune District in Maharashtra. There is only the single village of Talegaon Dhamdhere in the Talegaon Dhamdhere gram panchayat.  The village of Talegaon Dhamdhere is 4 km by road southeast of the village of Shikrapur, and 6 km by road north of the village of Vittalwadi.

The main surnames of Talegaon Dhamdhere are:-Dhamdhere, Bhujbal, Todkar etc.

Demographics 
In the 2001 census, the village of Talegaon Dhamdhere had 13,410 inhabitants, with 6,912 males (51.5%) and 6,498 females (48.5%), for a gender ratio of 940 females per thousand males.

Notes

External links 
 
 

Villages in Pune district